The Imperial lemon is thought to be a lemon and grapefruit hybrid. Its fruit is slightly larger than a lemon and has a more rounded shape.

References

Lemons
Grapefruit
Hybrid fruit